Lago delle Nazioni (Nations' lake) is a lake in the Province of Ferrara, Emilia-Romagna, Italy. At an elevation of 2 m, its surface area is 0.9 km2.

Lakes of Emilia-Romagna